Hollie McKay is an Australian born journalist who formerly worked for Fox News. She is a national bureau correspondent covering national and international news from Iraq, Afghanistan, Iran, Russia, Turkey, Syria, Pakistan, Yemen, Myanmar and Ukraine.

Early life and education
Hollie McKay was born 5 October 1985 in Mackay, Queensland. She attended The McDonald College in Sydney for secondary school.

In 2000, she published a novel entitled Sworn to Secrecy. McKay studied Communications at the University of Technology Sydney before moving to New York City in 2006 to complete her final semester at Pace University.

Career
After moving to New York, McKay began working as an intern at Fox News. She later moved to Los Angeles. She reported on entertainment news with an online column and a series of television segments. From 2007 to 2013, McKay wrote an entertainment column called "Pop Tarts" for the Fox News website, and appeared on Fox News television broadcasts in a series of segments called "Hollie on Hollywood".

McKay has reported on Clint Eastwood, Anthony Bourdain, and the Ferguson unrest of 2014.

Since 2014, McKay has served as an investigative reporter and foreign correspondent for the Fox national bureau. She has reported extensively from the battlefields in Iraq, including embedded service with U.S. and Australian forces. During her investigative reporting in Iraq from 2014-2020, McKay uncovered mass sex-slavery perpetrated by ISIS, particularly against Yazidis. McKay documented dozens of witness and first hand survivor accounts to be used in later tribunals and court cases in Iraq.

In 2017, McKay returned to New York City, where she became a member of Fox Digital Studio's "original news" staff. Also in 2017, McKay reported extensively from Kabul, Afghanistan, the Panjshir Valley, and other areas of the country. In her reporting, she interviewed a wide range of Afghan government officials, members of the Afghan National Security Forces, and others, including Afghanistan's Chief Executive Abdullah Abdullah, former President Hamid Karzai, former Vice President Ahmad Zia Massoud, and Vice President Abdul Rashid Dostum (Dostum was interviewed by McKay while he was in temporary exile in Turkey). In Afghanistan, McKay investigated and reported on numerous subjects including the status of women and Women's rights in Afghanistan, Taliban attacks on Afghan forces, and how terrorists enter Afghanistan.

McKay maintains a permanent press pass to the United Nations. She met with Pakistani Ambassador Khalid Mahmood on March 19, 2018 discussion counter-terrorism in Afghanistan and Pakistan. She has reported on issues related to the Kashmir conflict.

McKay was a human rights and cultural consultant advisor to Infinity Ward for the creation of the video game Call of Duty: Modern Warfare. In that role, McKay crafted story ideas and features for their behind-the-scenes global promotional materials. McKay was featured in the 2019 documentary about the game's authentic recreation of actual battle conditions.

McKay serves on the Honorary and Advisory Board of the humanitarian NGO Emergency USA which supports healthcare to victims of war, poverty and landmines in Afghanistan, Eritrea, Iraq, Italy, Sierra Leone, Sudan and Uganda.

Books
In 2021, McKay published Only Cry for the Living, a historical work that chronicles the human stories she encountered in while covering the war with ISIS between 2014 and 2019. The publisher's synopsis on Amazon.com:
 

In 2023, McKay released Afghanistan: The End of the US Footprint and the Rise of the Taliban Rule.  The publisher synopsis reads,

References

External links
Hollie McKay's Official Fox News Biography

Australian women journalists
Living people
Australian war correspondents
Women war correspondents
Fox News people
1985 births